The Doubles luge competition at the 1980 Winter Olympics in Lake Placid was held on 19 February, at Mt. Van Hoevenberg Olympic Bobsled Run. The doubles team of Hans Rinn and Norbert Hahn became the first repeat winners of an Olympic luge event.

Results

References

Luge at the 1980 Winter Olympics
Men's events at the 1980 Winter Olympics